The Alpine zephyr blue (Kretania trappi) is a species of butterfly in the family Lycaenidae. It is found in Italy and Switzerland. Its natural habitats are temperate forests and temperate grassland. It is threatened by habitat loss.

References

Sources

External links
lepiforum.de Images. Taxonomy.

Kretania
Butterflies described in 1927
Butterflies of Europe
Taxa named by Ruggero Verity
Taxonomy articles created by Polbot
Taxobox binomials not recognized by IUCN